Dianne Lynn Chambless (born February 26, 1948) is an American clinical psychologist.

Early life and education
Chambless was born on February 26, 1948. She earned her Bachelor of Arts degree in political science from Tulane University and her PhD in Clinical Psychology from Temple University. While earning her PhD, she joined the Feminist Therapy Collective, Inc. in Philadelphia, Pennsylvania part-time until 1976.

Career
Upon earning her PhD, Chambless became an Assistant professor at the University of Georgia from 1979 to 1982. She accepted a one-year visiting professorship at Temple University School of Medicine before earning a permanent position at American University. While at the university, she was appointed to Chair of the American Psychological Association (APA) Promotion and Dissemination of Psychological Procedures task force. In this role, she helped to develop criteria for empirically evaluating psychological treatments and make recommendations. She left American University to become the William Leon Wylie Professor of Psychology at the University of North Carolina at Chapel Hill (UNC). While at UNC, she became the co-director of their Anxiety Treatment Center and published Empirically supported psychological interventions: Controversies and evidence.

In 2001, Chambless left UNC to accept a Full professor position at the University of Pennsylvania. While there, she published numerous articles of anxiety disorders  such as Cognitive–behavioral therapy for adult anxiety disorders in clinical practice: A meta-analysis of effectiveness studies and Adjunctive couple and family intervention for patients with anxiety disorders. In 2010, she received the Aaron T. Beck Award for Sustained and Enduring Contributions to Cognitive Therapy and later the Klaus-Grawe-Award for the Advancement of Innovative Research in Clinical Psychology and Psychotherapy. A few years later, she was the recipient of the 2017 Lifetime Achievement Award from the Association for Behavioral & Cognitive Therapies.

References

External links
 

Living people
1948 births
American clinical psychologists
University of Pennsylvania faculty
University of Georgia faculty
American University faculty and staff
University of North Carolina at Chapel Hill faculty
Tulane University alumni
Temple University alumni